Gholam Ali Jafarzadeh Emenabadi is an Iranian politician who is member of the Parliament of Iran representing Rasht since 2012.

References

1966 births
Living people
Members of the 9th Islamic Consultative Assembly
Members of the 10th Islamic Consultative Assembly
People from Rasht
Deputies of Rasht
Volunteer Basij personnel of the Iran–Iraq War
Iranian politicians with disabilities